"Sexed Up" is a song by British pop singer Robbie Williams, released as the fourth and last single from his album Escapology in November 2003. It was originally recorded for Natalie Imbruglia, who turned it down. Williams had earlier released it in 1998 in demo form as the B-side to his single "No Regrets".

There are two versions of the song, the album/single version and an unplugged version. The unplugged version has one different lyric line ("I'll lay a bet/that I'm okay" instead of "I can't awaken the dead/day after day" on the first verse) and the guitar solo before the bridge is one measure longer.

Chart performance
The single became another top-ten hit for Robbie Williams in the United Kingdom when it was released in November that year, peaking at number 10, and it reached the top 20 in Australia, Denmark, Ireland, Italy and the Netherlands. In Brazil, the was included in the soundtrack of telenovela Mulheres Apaixonadas, in which it played as the theme to the characters Diogo (Rodrigo Santoro) and Marina (Paloma Duarte), a young married couple plagued by infidelity. The single received a special limited release in Australia and New Zealand featuring a bonus live track, special packing and a bonus fold-out poster.

Music video
The music video was directed by Jonas Åkerlund and features the actress Jaime King.

Track listings

UK CD single
 "Sexed Up" – 4:19
 "Get a Little High" – 3:55
 "Appliance of Science" – 4:52
 Trailer
 Photo gallery

UK DVD single
 "Sexed Up" (video) – 4:06
 "Appliance of Science" (audio) – 4:52
 "Big Beef" (audio) – 3:40
 Trailer
 Photo gallery

European CD single
 "Sexed Up" – 4:19
 "Get a Little High" – 3:55

Australian and New Zealand CD single
 "Sexed Up" – 4:19
 "Get a Little High" – 3:55
 "Appliance of Science" – 4:52
 "Rock DJ" (live at Knebworth)
 Trailer
 Photo gallery

Credits and personnel
Credits are taken from the Escapology album booklet.

Recording
 Recorded in Los Angeles and London
 Mixed at The Record Plant (Los Angeles)
 Mastered at Marcussen Mastering (Los Angeles)

Personnel

 Robbie Williams – writing, lead vocals
 Guy Chambers – writing, piano, production, arrangement
 Gary Nuttall – acoustic guitar
 Neil Taylor – electric guitar
 Melvin Duffy – pedal steel guitar
 Phil Spalding – bass
 Jeremy Stacey – drums
 Luís Jardim – percussion
 London Session Orchestra – orchestra
 Gavyn Wright – concertmaster
 Sally Herbert – orchestral arrangement
 Steve Price – orchestral engineering
 Tom Jenkins – assistant orchestral engineering
 Isobel Griffiths – orchestral contracting
 Jim Brumby – programming, additional engineering
 Steve Power – production, mixing
 J.D. Andrew – assistant mixing
 Richard Flack – engineering, programming
 Steve Marcussen – mastering

Charts

Weekly charts

Year-end charts

Release history

References

 Robbie Williams Info – Singles – accessed on 9 November 2005.

2002 songs
2003 singles
Chrysalis Records singles
Music videos directed by Jonas Åkerlund
Robbie Williams songs
Song recordings produced by Guy Chambers
Song recordings produced by Steve Power
Songs written by Guy Chambers
Songs written by Robbie Williams